Olivia Wilde is an American actress and filmmaker. She is known for her role as Remy "Thirteen" Hadley on the medical-drama television series House (2007–2012), and her roles in the films Conversations with Other Women (2005), Alpha Dog (2007), Tron: Legacy (2010), Cowboys & Aliens (2011), Butter (2011), Drinking Buddies (2013), The Incredible Burt Wonderstone (2013), Rush (2013), The Lazarus Effect (2015), Love the Coopers (2015), and Meadowland (2015). In 2017, Wilde made her Broadway debut, playing the role of Julia in 1984. In 2019, she directed her first film, the teen comedy Booksmart, to critical acclaim. She then directed the 2022 film Don't Worry Darling.

Film

Television

Theatre

Music videos

Video games

References

External links
 Olivia Wilde at the Internet Movie Database

Actress filmographies
American filmographies